The Very Clever Pipe Game is a card game produced by Cheapass Games.

Gameplay
It can be played by 2-4 people, or more in teams. Like other pipe games, the objective can be to create a closed circuit in pipes of your color by playing cards from your hand.  When you accomplish this, you pick up the cards. Whoever has the most cards at the end wins.  However, what makes this game unique (and thus, according to the maker, Very Clever) is that you can also choose to close off fields of light or dark backgrounds. If you have four players, for instance, each has a different goal: light pipes, dark pipes, light backgrounds, or dark backgrounds.  With so many competing goals, the game becomes quite complicated.

There are two basic strategies to this game.  Some players prefer to make small circuits of only two or three cards, and others attempt to build up their circuit to pick up many cards at a time.  Either strategy can win, although the former is more safe and the latter more of a gamble.  Often, the strategy players choose depends on the cards they hold in their hands.  In addition, an important part of the strategy in this game is blocking opponents before they can gather cards.

Reception
The reviewer from Pyramid #29 (Jan./Feb., 1998) stated that "The Very Clever Pipe Game is indeed quite clever. You've probably seen games where you have to connect pipes to win - it's been done before. But this version has two different colored pipes on each card - and two different colored backgrounds - and the pipes keep disappearing."

References

External links

Card games introduced in 1996
Cheapass Games games
Dedicated deck card games